Still Psycho is the seventh album released by rapper, Ganxsta N.I.P. It was released in 2008 through his own label, Psycho Ward Entertainment. The album was released after 5 years from his last album "The Return of the Psychopath". The only guest on the album is K-Rino. Producers on the album are X-Productions, Mike B, Candyman, Jerry X.

Track listing
"We Can Rebuild Ganxsta Nip"- 4:53 
Producer - Mike B
"Brought Me Back from da Dead!"- 3:41 
 Producer - Candyman 
"Nip Is Back!!!"- 3:15 	
 Producer - Mike B* 
"Nip-U-Later"- 4:27 
"Blood Thirsty"- 3:13 
"Down South"- 3:35 
"Still Psycho"- 3:21 
"Bob Ya Head"- 3:06 
"Go Crazy"- 3:27 
"Fuck Dem Cops!"- 4:22 
"Take Over"- 4:40 (Featuring K-Rino)
"Real Talk"- 3:19 
"Conversation with the Reaper"- 3:50 
 Producer - Candyman (9)
"Streets of South Park"- 3:14 
 Producer - Jerry X
"Outro"- 1:15

Personnel

Engineer - J-Blast

Mixed By - J-Blast

Photography - Peter Beste

Producer - X-Production* (tracks: 4 to 12)

Written-By - Ganxsta N.I.P 

2008 albums
Horrorcore albums